Benjamin F. Pleasants (November 10, 1795 – June 2, 1879) was an American government official who served as acting Solicitor of the United States Treasury.  He was also the son in law of John Adair.

Biography
Benjamin Franklin Pleasants was born in Richmond, Virginia, on November 10, 1795.  In 1803 his family relocated to Versailles, Kentucky, where he was raised and educated.

In February, 1817 Pleasants married Isabella McCalla Adair.  He lived in Harrodsburg, Kentucky, studied law and was admitted to the bar, and also served as Cashier of the Bank of the Commonwealth in Harrodsburg.

In 1830 Pleasants was appointed to a Clerk's position in the United States Treasury Department.  During his government career he became Chief Clerk in the Office of the Solicitor of the Treasury, and he occasionally served as acting Solicitor of the Treasury.

Pleasants continued to work at the Treasury Department almost until his death.  He died in Washington, D.C., on June 2, 1879.  He was buried in Washington's Oak Hill Cemetery.

References

1795 births
1879 deaths
Lawyers from Richmond, Virginia
People from Woodford County, Kentucky
United States Department of the Treasury officials
People from Harrodsburg, Kentucky
19th-century American lawyers
Burials at Oak Hill Cemetery (Washington, D.C.)